B Hill may refer to:

People
 A.B. Hill (1838–1887), New York Stock Exchange official
 Austin Bradford Hill (1897–1991), English epidemiologist and statistician
 David B. Hill (1843–1910), former governor of New York
 James B. Hill (1856–1945), American inventor
 Samuel B. Hill (Washington politician) (1875–1958), U.S representative from the state of Washington
 Samuel B. Hill (Ohio politician) (born 1862), member of the Ohio House of Representatives
 Walter Barnard Hill (1851–1905), former chancellor of the University of Georgia in Athens

For other people with the surname Hill and a forename beginning with B, see Hill (surname).

Places
 Burgess Hill, a town in West Sussex, England, UK